The Oregon Trail: A New American Journey is a 2015 non-fiction book by Rinker Buck, author of Flight of Passage (Hyperion Books, 1997). The Oregon Trail is an account of Buck's epic 2011 journey along the Oregon Trail in a covered wagon. It was published by Simon & Schuster and is available in hardcover, audio book and eBook.

Praise 
George Howe Colt "Part Laura Ingalls Wilder, part Jack Kerouac, The Oregon Trail is an idiosyncratic and irresistible addition to the canon of American road-trip literature."
Kirkus Reviews "Astonishing...By turns frankly hilarious, historically elucidating, emotionally touching, and deeply informative...An inspired exploration of American identity."
Publishers Weekly "''An entertaining and enlightening account of one of America’s most legendary migrations. Even readers who don’t know a horse from a mule will find themselves swept up in this inspiring and masterful tale of perseverance and the pioneer spirit.

References

External links 

Oregon Trail
2015 non-fiction books
Simon & Schuster books